This is a list of some of the more notable cemeteries in South Africa

List of existing cemeteries

Vanderbijlpark Cemetery

Evaton Cemetery

Phelandaba Cemetery

Vuka Cemetery

Nanescol Cemetery

Aberdeen Cemetery, Eastern Cape

South Africa